Remember the Story is the fifth studio album by American metal band Fireball Ministry. It was released via Cleopatra Records in 2017.

The album has a vulture and two blown out candles on the front cover, contrasting to the back cover with a vulture in-flight and the candles re-lit. This is support the album's themes of death and renewal.

Track listing

Personnel

Emily J. Burton - composer, guitar, background vocals
Phil Campbell - composer
Mikkey Dee - composer
Lemmy Kilmister - composer
John Oreshnick - composer, drums, gong, vocals
Scott Reeder - bass, composer, vocals
James A. Rota - composer, guitar, vocals

Production
Paul Fig - engineer, mixing, producer
Gene Grimaldi - mastering
Caitlin Mattisson - artwork
Andrew Stuart - photography

References

2017 albums
Fireball Ministry albums